Mountrath Community School is a secondary school in Mountrath, County Laois in Ireland.

It is an amalgamation of three former secondary schools (namely the Bridgidine Convent, St Aengus Vocational School, and Patrician College) all of which closed in 2009 and reopened as a combined school in September 2009. The Patrician Brothers and Le Chéile Trust, the Brigidine Sisters and the Laois
Vocational Education Committee are the trustees of the community school.

References

External links
 

Education in County Laois
Community schools in the Republic of Ireland